Steinar Reiten (born 10 May 1963) is a Norwegian politician for the Christian Democratic Party.

He served as a deputy representative to the Parliament of Norway from Hedmark during the term 2001–2005 and Møre og Romsdal during the term 2009–2013.

References

1963 births
Living people
Deputy members of the Storting
Christian Democratic Party (Norway) politicians
Hedmark politicians
Møre og Romsdal politicians